Martin James Heeney (born April 1973) is a Professor of Organic Materials at Imperial College London.

Heeney is a graduate of University of East Anglia, and received his PhD in organic materials chemistry from the same institution in 1999 under the supervision of Prof Michael Cook.

He was awarded the Corday–Morgan Prize by the Royal Society of Chemistry in 2013.

He has an h-index of 93 according to Google Scholar.

References 

1973 births
Living people
Alumni of the University of East Anglia
Academics of Queen Mary University of London
Academics of Imperial College London